Michel Delacroix (born 1933) is a French painter in the "naif" style.

Delacroix was born in Paris. He studied at the Lycee Louis-le-Grand. He has had one man shows as well as group exhibitions in Europe. Delacroix's primitive style in his paintings and graphics combine structure and detail with rich colour to convey the bustling, diverse activity of the streets of Paris.

Delacroix's subjects include street scenes of Paris and other nearby areas of France set during his childhood during the Nazi occupation; he was only seven years old at the time. He is the father of French painter Fabienne Delacroix. He is also the father of the late Bertrand Delacroix (1965–2015) who opened fine art galleries in New York City and Boston which represent his father's work.

Delacroix had an exhibition entitled Le Temps Retrouvé at Axelle Fine Arts Galerie in New York City which opened on December 5, 2015.

References

General references
 Hackenberg, D. Michel Delacroix. 1st. Hackenberg Inc., 2007.

External links
 Delacroix at M Fine Arts Galerie

1933 births
Living people
Painters from Paris
20th-century French painters
20th-century French male artists
French male painters
21st-century French painters
21st-century French male artists
Naïve painters